The Children's Museum of Southeastern Connecticut is an interactive educational and cultural institution located in Niantic, Connecticut.

The museum features 3 major areas: The Discovery Room features a variety of science-based activities. The Imaginative Play area featuring imagination playground building blocks that encourage kids to build various structures using large foam building blocks. Also in this area is a new train exhibit featuring Dreamup Toys of East Lyme, CT.  The Global Village with cultural exhibits allowing interactive play and a Toddler Area for the smallest of visitors. The Outdoor Playspaces feature a tree house, chimes, a whale drum, giant sand pit, water area, a performing stage and an authentic two-person research submarine.

References

External links
The Children's Museum of Southeastern Connecticut web site

Museums in New London County, Connecticut
Children's museums in Connecticut